Bruce Dessau is a British arts critic who writes for the London Evening Standard and other publications, as well as his own website BeyondTheJoke.co.uk.

He is the author of biographies of Rowan Atkinson and George Michael, as well as Beyond a Joke (2011), a non-fiction book about the private lives of comedians and the difficulties in the comedy industry.

References

External links
BeyondTheJoke.co.uk

Living people
British critics
British non-fiction writers
British biographers
Year of birth missing (living people)
British male writers
Male non-fiction writers